Gusenbauer is a surname. Notable people with the surname include:

Alfred Gusenbauer (born 1960), Austrian politician
Ilona Gusenbauer (born 1947), Austrian high jumper

See also
Carl Gussenbauer (1842–1903), Austrian surgeon